Fefana or FEFANA may refer to:

 Fefana, Hanumangarh, Rajasthan, a village in Rajasthan, India
 Phephna, a village in Uttar Pradesh, India
Phephana (Assembly constituency)
 FEFANA, the EU Association of Specialty Feed Ingredients and their Mixtures